Universidad Panamericana (English: Panamerican University), commonly known as UP, is a private research, Catholic university founded in Mexico City. It has four campuses: the main Mixcoac campus in the Benito Juarez borough of south-western Mexico City, founded in 1968; the Guadalajara campus established in 1981; the Aguascalientes campus established in 1989; and Campus Santa Fe, also in Mexico City, founded in 2011. One of the most prestihious universities in Mexico, it  is currently ranked 3rd best university in Mexico by QS World University Rankings and 2nd best private university.

History

The university was founded in 1967 as a business school, when a group of wealthy and devout catholic businessmen and academics, inspired by the University of Navarra and University of Salamanca, gave life to the Instituto Panamericano de Alta Dirección de Empresas (English: Panamerican Institute for Executive Business Management), also known as IPADE. Soon later, they promoted the creation of a university. As a result, the Instituto Panamericano de Humanidades (Panamerican Institute of Humanities), founded in 1968, merged with the IPADE and created the Panamerican University. It was all done under the spiritual direction of Opus Dei, a personal prelature of the Catholic Church.

Carlos Llano Cifuentes, a Mexican philosopher who had ties with Opus Dei, is often named the 'father of the university' because of his longstanding involvement in the conception of the institute.

In 1978, the IPH was given University rank and took the name Universidad Panamericana, even though the IPADE and IPH conceived from their origins the universal and unitarian knowledge.

The new university began with only two programs, Pedagogy and Administration. During the 1970s new programs were added, including Law and Philosophy (1970), Economics and Business Administration (1977), and Industrial Engineering (1978). Further new programs were added in the 1980s and 1990s, including Electromechanic Engineering, Accountancy (1981), Informatics, Marketing, International Business, Finance (1993), and Medicine (1996).

Motto and Coat of Arms
Ubi spiritus, libertas (Where the spirit is, there is freedom) is the university's motto, synthesizing the educational philosophy. Love of freedom in a space where the human spirit is cultivated—love of authentic freedom.

The University's arms is formed by two elements: The red square and the blue band on the golden left side, which represent the coat of arms used by Christopher Columbus when he landed in the Americas; they symbolize Pan-Americanism.

On the right side, on top of a golden bottom, there's an Oak, symbol of strength. Its roots are the diverse sources of integral development; the four ramifications symbolize the Cardinal Virtues: Prudence, Justice, Fortitude and Temperance; the leaves and acorns represent the rest of the virtues, which derive of the fundamental four.

Schools and Faculties
Currently, the university offers 42 undergraduate academic programs, known as licenciaturas or ingenierías (equivalent to Bachelor of Arts, Bachelor of Science and Bachelor of Laws), as well as 120 graduate programs.

Universidad Panamericana has 5 Schools and 3 Faculties.

School of Institutions Administration
School of Health Sciences
School of Economic and Administrative Sciences
School of Communication
Faculty of Engineer
Faculty of Law
Faculty of Philosophy
Faculty of Pedagogy
UP is widely known for its 'specialty' programs, a 1 year-long graduate program to study a certain topic, distinguishing from a Master's degree in that master programs have a duration of 2 years, in addition, speciality students do not have to write a Thesis in order to graduate.

The University is also in charge of the Preparatoria Universidad Panamericana (Panamerican University Highschool), a high school with the same educational principles. It has two distinct campuses one for boys and another for girls, called Yaocalli.

Accreditations 

 ABET (Accreditation Board for Engineering and Technology)
 CENEVAL (Centro Nacional para la Evaluación de la Educación Superior)
 ENARM (Examen Nacional de Aspirantes a Residencias Médicas)

Reputation

 Ranked 3rd best university in Mexico by QS World University Rankings
 2nd best private university in Mexico by QS World University Rankings
 3rd best private university in Mexico by Times Higher Education World University Rankings in LatinAmerica.

For more information see the IPADE Rankings.

International Programs
For several years, the university has offered several exchange agreements with the following universities (among others):

Fachhochschule Schmalkalden
University of Lethbridge
University of Navarra
University of Westminster
University of Exeter
Université de Montréal
Bond University
Dalhousie University
European Business School International University Schloss Reichartshausen
Shanghai Normal University

Faculty

Carlos Abascal
Hector Zagal
Leonardo Polo
Miguel Alessio Robles
Sergio Salvador Aguirre Anguiano

Notable alumni

Politicians
 Enrique Peña Nieto (L.L.B.), 57th President of Mexico (2012-2018)
 Miguel Alonso Reyes (L.L.B.), Governor of Zacatecas (2010-)
 César Nava Vázquez (L.L.B.),  President of the National Action Party (2009-2010); Representative for Mexico City (2009-2012); Personal Secretary to the President (2006-2008)

Academic
 Hector Zagal, philosopher and writer

Honoris Causa degrees 
Some of the Honoris Causa degrees awarded by the UP include:

Kim B. Clark, American economist

Affiliated schools 
 Universidad Panamericana Preparatoria (senior high school)

Controversy 
Mexican journalist Carmen Aristegui published a series of reports on alleged plagiarism found in the thesis entitled "The Mexican presidentialism and Alvaro Obregon" from the current President of Mexico Enrique Peña Nieto, to obtain a degree in law at Panamerican University. The university informed their community that a group of "distinguished members" would make an analysis of this thesis and issued an institutional statement dated August 28 informing that the graduating procedure of Enrique Peña Nieto complied with the requirements back in the year 1991 and the thesis of his own presents both original ideas and ideas from other authors treated in five different ways:
 Textual fragment reproduction of previously published works according to academic standards
 Textual fragment reproduction without quotes or footer section of the literature
 Support Reproductions in which there is no quoted footnote reference but in the reference section
 Textual reproduction in which credit is given to the author of ambiguous or imprecise manner
 Cases in which credit is given to the original author, but not the source from which the quotation was taken

In the same statement the Law Faculty reports that proceeded to search rules that allow a proper response to a discovery of this nature and concluded that:
 This was an unprecedented case in which there are no provisions in the applicable regulatory bodies titration procedure, a technical consultation to the National Autonomous University of Mexico was asked to confirm in writing this criterion
 The General Regulations from that institution does not apply to former students
 It is a consummated act on which it is impossible to proceed in any way

References

External links
 Official website in Spanish

Panamerican University
Educational institutions established in 1967
Catholic universities and colleges in Mexico
1967 establishments in Mexico